The 2022 TSport 200 was the 17th stock car race of the 2022 NASCAR Camping World Truck Series, the first race of the Round of 10, and the 18th iteration of the event. The race was held on Friday, July 29, 2022, in Brownsburg, Indiana at Lucas Oil Indianapolis Raceway Park, a  permanent oval-shaped racetrack. The race was increased from 200 to 207 laps, due to a NASCAR overtime finish. In the final laps of the race, Grant Enfinger, driving for GMS Racing, took home the victory, after holding off the rest of the field with 2 laps to go. This was Enfinger's 7th career NASCAR Camping World Truck Series win, and his first win since 2020. He would also earn a spot in the next round of the playoffs. John Hunter Nemechek and Ty Majeski mainly dominated the race, leading 75 and 71 laps, respectively. To fill out the podium, Ben Rhodes, driving for ThorSport Racing, and Zane Smith, driving for Front Row Motorsports, would finish 2nd and 3rd, respectively.

This was the debut race for the NASCAR Advance Auto Parts Weekly Series driver, Layne Riggs. Riggs would go on to finish 7th in his first ever start.

Background 
It includes a  oval track, a  road course (which has fallen into disrepair and is no longer used), and a  drag strip which is among the premier drag racing venues in the world. The complex receives about 500,000 visitors annually.

Entry list 

 (R) denotes rookie driver.

Practice 
The only 50-minute practice session was held on Friday, July 29, at 11:05 AM EST.

Qualifying 
Qualifying was held on Friday, July 29, at 5:05 PM EST. Since Lucas Oil Indianapolis Raceway Park is an oval track, the qualifying system used is a single-car, two-lap system with only one round. Whoever sets the fastest time in the round wins the pole.

Race results 
Stage 1 Laps: 60

Stage 2 Laps: 60

Stage 3 Laps: 87

Standings after the race 

Drivers' Championship standings

Note: Only the first 10 positions are included for the driver standings.

References 

2022 NASCAR Camping World Truck Series
NASCAR races at Lucas Oil Raceway at Indianapolis
TSport 200
2022 in sports in Indiana